Skryne Castle ( or ) is a castle located at Skryne, County Meath, Ireland. The motte and bailey castle was built by Adam de Feypo in the 12th century.

References

Castles in County Meath